Five Cities is a 2010 Turkish drama film, written, produced and directed by Onur Ünlü, about a young policeman just arrived in Istanbul who falls in love with a woman in a candy shop.

Synopsis
Aydın is a policeman recently appointed to a new post in Istanbul. While trying to get used to life in the big city, Aydın stumbles upon Mehtap, a young woman who works at a candy shop in Beyoğlu, and he falls for her. But there is no way that Aydın can make Mehtap realize that he even exists, just as Şevket, a young man who has dropped out of law school before starting to sell toy trains on the streets to make a living, cannot make Dilek, another girl who works at the same store, realize his feelings for her. When Dilek and Aydın meet, Aydın diverts his uncontrollable feelings toward Dilek.

Release

General Release

Festival Screenings
 46th Antalya Golden Orange Film Festival (October 10–17, 2009)
 29th International Istanbul Film Festival (April 3–18, 2010)

Reception

Box Office
The film was in the Turkish box office charts for four weeks and has made a total gross of US$16,329.

Reviews
Emine Yıdırım, writing in Today's Zaman, describes the film as, an ensemble cast piece of intertwined stories of the Robert Altman School. The same publication has also described the film as absurd poetic tale of five seemingly unrelated people's lives intertwining in a most interesting way.

Awards
 46th Antalya Golden Orange Film Festival Best Screenplay Award: Onur Ünlü (won)
 29th International Istanbul Film Festival Best Actor Award: Tansu Biçer (won)

See also 
 2010 in film
 Turkish films of 2010

External links

References

2010 films
2010s Turkish-language films
2010 drama films
Films set in Istanbul
Films set in Turkey
Turkish drama films